Rhaphiptera rixator is a species of beetle in the family Cerambycidae. It was described by James Thomson in 1868. It is known from French Guiana and Brazil.

References

rixator
Beetles described in 1868